The Garden of Cyrus, or The Quincuncial Lozenge, or Network Plantations of the Ancients, naturally, artificially, mystically considered, is a discourse by Sir Thomas Browne. First published in 1658, along with its diptych companion Urn-Burial, in modern times it has been recognised as Browne's major literary contribution to Hermetic wisdom.

The discourse concerns itself with the use of the quincunx as a geometric pattern in art and nature.

Written during a time when restrictions on publishing became more relaxed during Oliver Cromwell's Protectorate, The Garden of Cyrus (1658) is Browne's contribution to a "boom period" decade of interest in esoterica in England. Browne's discourse is a Neoplatonic and Neopythagorean vision of the interconnection of art and nature via the inter-related symbols of the number five and the quincunx pattern, along with the figure X and the lattice design. Its fundamental quest was of primary concern to Hermetic philosophy: proof of the wisdom of God, and demonstrable evidence of intelligent design. The Discourse includes early recorded usage of the words "prototype" and "archetype" in English.

The critic Edmund Gosse (d. 1928) complained that "gathering his forces it is Quincunx, Quincunx, all the way until the very sky itself is darkened with revolving Chess-boards", while conceding that "this radically bad book contains some of the most lovely paragraphs which passed from an English pen during the seventeenth Century".

References

External links

 Complete text of The Garden of Cyrus
 Essay on Browne and Hermeticism

1658 books
Philosophy books
Hermeticism
Esotericism
Works by Thomas Browne
Gardening books